Harvey M. Schwartz (born 1964) is an American businessperson, investor and philanthropist. He currently serves as CEO of The Carlyle Group, the world’s second-largest private equity firm. He is also group chairperson and non-executive director of The Bank of London, a clearing and transaction bank. He also serves on the board of SoFi, a San Francisco-based fintech company, and One Mind, a mental health and brain research nonprofit organization. He formerly worked at Goldman Sachs from 1997 to 2018, with his last post there being president and co-chief operating officer.

Early life and career
Schwartz was born in Morristown, NJ and graduated with a bachelor’s degree in economics from Rutgers University in 1987.

He started his career at J. B. Hanauer & Co., and then moved to First Interregional Equity Corporation. In 1989, Schwartz joined Citigroup, where he worked in the firm's credit training program and developed a specialty in structuring commodity derivatives.

Schwartz received his MBA in 1996 from Columbia Business School, and joined Goldman Sachs (NYSE:GS) in 1997 as a vice president in its commodities trading business, J. Aron & Co., which the investment bank acquired in 1981. At Goldman Sachs, he held several senior executive leadership roles overseeing sales and trading, finance, technology and operations. He served as the firm’s chief financial officer beginning in 2012, and then became president and co-COO starting in 2016, with David M. Solomon being the other co-COO. Schwartz retired from Goldman Sachs in 2018, and shortly afterward Solomon was designated as the successor to outgoing CEO Lloyd Blankfein.

Schwartz joined the board of directors of SoFi Technologies Inc. (NASDAQ:SOFI) as the company became public in early 2021. In November 2021, Schwartz assumed the role of group chairperson and non-executive director of The Bank of London. The Bank of London is a privately held global company with a $1.1bn valuation, which provides clearing, agency, and transaction banking services. Schwartz sits on the board of One Mind, a research and mental health advocacy nonprofit organization.

Schwartz supported Democratic presidential candidate Joseph Biden in the 2020 U.S. presidential election by contributing at least $100,000 to the Biden Action Fund.

References

Columbia Business School alumni
Living people
Rutgers University alumni
Goldman Sachs people
American chief financial officers
1964 births